The Rehe Guard Army was a corps of the Manchukuo Imperial Army, formed after the conquest of the former Chinese province of Rehe during Operation Nekka in 1933. The Rehe Guard Army was created from a section of the Taoliao Army and had a nominal strength of 17,945 men

 Headquarters (301) 
 Artillery Unit (854) 
 Cavalry Unit (172) 
 Infantry Unit (1,294) 
 Chengde Area Forces (4,783) 
 Chifeng Area Forces (3,414) 
 Chaoyang Area Forces (3,977) 
 Weichang Area Forces (3,150) 
 Xinjing Cavalry Brigade (2,018)
 Seiyan Army (Fangtian Area Forces) (3,760)
 River Patrol Unit (640)

In the 1935 reorganization of the Manchukuo Imperial Army it became the 5th District Army "Chengde" under command of General Chang Hai-peng.

Sources

Armies of Manchukuo
Second Sino-Japanese War